The list of ship decommissionings in 1987 includes a chronological list of all ships decommissioned in 1987.


See also 

1987
 Ship decommissionings
Ship